The Shadows of a Great City is an 1884 American play by Herbert Blaché and Aaron Hoffman.

Adaptations
The film was turned into a 1913 British silent film Shadows of a Great City directed by Frank Wilson. In 1915 an American silent version The Shadows of a Great City was made, directed by Blaché himself.

References

Bibliography
 Goble, Alan. The Complete Index to Literary Sources in Film. Walter de Gruyter, 1999.

1884 plays
American plays adapted into films